Joseph Robinson (4 March 1919 – 12 July 1991) was an English football goalkeeper. He played for Blackpool in their appearance in the 1948 FA Cup Final against Manchester United.

Playing career

Hartlepools United
Born in Morpeth, Northumberland, Robinson began his career at Third Division North side Hartlepools United.

Blackpool
Robinson joined First Division side Blackpool in 1947. After He made his Football League debut for them on 17 January 1948, in a 1–1 draw with Wolverhampton Wanderers at Molineux Stadium, replacing Jock Wallace for the second half of the 1947–48 season.

He kept four successive clean sheets in the club's FA Cup run that season, which took them to the final at Wembley, where they lost 2–4 to Manchester United. Robinson's appearance in the final came after only seventeen games for Blackpool.

Robinson played in the first eight League games of the 1948–49 campaign before being sold to Hull City. He had made a total of 25 League appearances for Blackpool, and was succeeded in the Seasiders' goal by George Farm.

Hull City
Robinson moved across the Pennines to join Hull City in 1948, helping them to win the Third Division North title, and with it promotion to the Second Division in the 1948–49 season.

In five years with the Tigers, he made seventy League appearances.

Managerial career
Robinson had a brief career as a player-manager. He was in charge of non-League side Wisbech Town between 1953 and 1956.

Honours
Hull City
Third Division North champion: 1948–49.

Post-retirement

Death
Robinson died on 12 July 1991, at the age of 72.

Theft
In January 2010, Robinson's FA Cup runners-up medal was stolen in a burglary from his son, Keith's house in Lower Withington, Cheshire.

References

External links

Robinson's stats at Blackpool
Robinson's stats at Hull City

1919 births
1991 deaths
English footballers
English football managers
Association football goalkeepers
Hartlepool United F.C. players
Blackpool F.C. players
Hull City A.F.C. players
Wisbech Town F.C. players
People from Morpeth, Northumberland
Footballers from Northumberland
FA Cup Final players